Antonio Sorrentino may refer to:

Antonio Sorrentino, actor in Hei de Vencer
Antonio Sorrentino, character in Bitten (TV series)